The Pittsburgh–New Castle–Weirton, PA–OH–WV Combined Statistical Area is a 12-county combined statistical (CSA) in the United States. The largest and principal in the area is Pittsburgh, Pennsylvania, but the CSA includes population centers from three states: Pennsylvania, West Virginia, and Ohio.

The statistical area was officially defined by the U.S. Census Bureau in 2013. The estimated population of the area was 2,635,228 in mid-2016.

Boundaries

The following metropolitan and micropolitan statistical areas form the Pittsburgh-New Castle-Weirton, PA-OH-WV combined statistical area.

Pittsburgh, PA Metropolitan Statistical Area 

 Allegheny County, PA
 Armstrong County, PA
 Beaver County, PA
 Butler County, PA
 Fayette County, PA
 Washington County, PA
 Westmoreland County, PA

Weirton–Steubenville, WV–OH Metropolitan Statistical Area 

 Brooke County, WV
 Hancock County, WV
 Jefferson County, OH

New Castle, PA Micropolitan Statistical Area 
 Lawrence County, PA

Indiana, PA Micropolitan Statistical Area 
 Indiana County, PA

Principal cities and towns

Demographics

Ethnic diversity 

According to the 2016 population estimates, Greater Pittsburgh is less diverse than the U.S. as a whole. Persons of color, or non-white Americans, represent only 13.5 percent of the region's population, compared to 38.7 percent in the United States overall.

The combined statistical area has, however, seen a significant increase in Asian Americans, Hispanic or Latino Americans, and Multiracial Americans since 2010. During the same period, the African-American population has remained essentially unchanged whereas the White population continues to steadily decrease.

Allegheny County, Pennsylvania is the most diverse of the twelve Pittsburgh CSA counties with persons of color representing 21 percent of the population, or 257,832 people. Armstrong County is the least diverse, with a population that is only 2.8 percent non-white.

The 2012–2016 American Community Survey estimated the region's foreign-born population at 3.4 percent. The largest plurality of this group, or 48.3 percent, were born in Asia, 27.8 percent in Europe, and 13.3 percent in Latin America. A supermajority (67.3 percent) of the region's most recent international arrivals, or those entering the country since 2010, were born in Asia.

Age 

Greater Pittsburgh's population has traditionally been significantly older than the United States as a whole. This is largely due to the large domestic out-migration which occurred during the steel industry's collapse in the 1970s and 1980s. Most out-migrants were working age at the time and this led to the area having a much greater than average elderly population than most areas of the country at the end of the 20th century. As of the 2012–2016 American Community Survey, Pittsburgh-New Castle-Weirton was the 11th oldest combined statistical area in the United States with a median age of 43 years. Greater Pittsburgh's population age structure is most similar to slower growing European countries such as Belgium, Finland, Greece, and Slovenia which all have similar median ages.

In recent decades, however, the growth of the oldest segments of the population has become more pronounced in the country overall and less so in Greater Pittsburgh. Between 2010 and 2016, the age 65 and over population of the region increased 9.8 percent whereas that age group grew by 22.3 percent in the United States over the same time period. Indiana and Allegheny counties, which both have significant college student populations, are the youngest counties in the region by median age and Allegheny County's median age has actually been declining in recent years. All of the remaining ten counties in the region have median ages well above the US and their respective states.  
Baby Boomers continue to represent the largest generational cohort in Greater Pittsburgh with 28.6 percent of the population in 2016. Millennials, along with the youngest generation, Generation Z, now represent 40.9 percent of the region's population which is roughly equal to the oldest generations (Baby Boomers, Silents, and World War II) with 41.7 percent of the population. As is the case in the United States as a whole, Millennials are now the largest generation in Allegheny and Indiana counties.

Income and earnings

The wealthiest counties by median household income in Greater Pittsburgh are Butler and Washington counties. Both counties have median incomes above those of the United States and Pennsylvania and have continued to experience strong income growth since the Great Recession and have benefited from being adjacent to many of the wealthiest suburbs in Allegheny County's in North and South Hills. Most counties in the region and the City of Pittsburgh showed reasonably strong gains in household income since the 2007–2011 American Community Survey (ACS) whereas Pennsylvania, Ohio, and the nation as a whole saw income declines over the same time period. This includes some of the less wealthy counties in the region, such as Fayette and Brooke counties. Despite this recent growth, however, the region's overall median household income remains slightly less than the United States overall.

According to the 2012–2016 ACS, there are 231 county subdivisions whose median incomes are greater or equal to the region's median ($52,274). The ten wealthiest districts are Sewickley Heights, Edgeworth, Ben Avon Heights, Fox Chapel, Sewickley Hills, Glen Osborne, Thornburg, Pine Township, Rosslyn Farms, and Franklin Park. Seven of these municipalities are in the wealthy Sewickley Valley and North Hills areas to the north and northwest of Pittsburgh and all of them are in Allegheny County. Other high income areas in the region include southern Butler County where the townships of Cranberry and Adams have become extensions of the North Hills, and the fast-growing South Hills, including the streetcar suburb of Mount Lebanon, the post-war suburb of Upper St. Clair in Allegheny County, and the more recently developed areas surrounding the Southpointe office complex such as Peters and Cecil townships in northern Washington County.

There are a greater number of districts (294) in the region, however, which have median household incomes below the Greater Pittsburgh median. The ten districts with the lowest median household incomes  are Duquesne, Braddock, Homestead, Rankin, Wilmerding, Arnold, East Pittsburgh, McKeesport, Uniontown, and Karns City. Seven of these districts are also in Allegheny County clustered in the largely deindustrialized Mon Valley and Turtle Creek Valley areas. Other areas with significantly low household incomes are several rural municipalities in far northern Butler, Armstrong, and Indiana counties as well as most of eastern and northern Fayette County which all have less accessibility to the regions main employment centers. The former mill towns of the Beaver Valley as well as the cities of New Castle, Steubenville, and Weirton, and their environs also have noticeably low median household income compared to the rest of the region.

Airports

Pittsburgh International Airport is the primary airport providing commercial passenger service to the Pittsburgh metropolitan area.

Other airports with scheduled commercial service that are convenient to certain parts of the Pittsburgh metropolitan area include Morgantown Municipal Airport ( south of Pittsburgh), Youngstown–Warren Regional Airport ( northwest of Pittsburgh), Akron–Canton Airport ( northwest of Pittsburgh), and Erie International Airport ( north of Pittsburgh).

See also 
Great Lakes Megalopolis
Pittsburgh Media Market
Western Pennsylvania

References 

Combined statistical areas of the United States
Pittsburgh metropolitan area
Allegheny County, Pennsylvania
Armstrong County, Pennsylvania
Beaver County, Pennsylvania
Brooke County, West Virginia
Butler County, Pennsylvania
Fayette County, Pennsylvania
Hancock County, West Virginia
Indiana County, Pennsylvania
Jefferson County, Ohio
Lawrence County, Pennsylvania
Washington County, Pennsylvania
Westmoreland County, Pennsylvania
Geography of Pittsburgh